Janet Nwadiogo Mokelu (born Janet Onwuegbuzia; February 7, 1910 – March 31, 2003) was a Nigerian politician, philanthropist, nurse, teacher, headmistress and businesswoman. She was able to distinguish herself as an educationist, a committed activist and a nationalist. A one time member of the Eastern House of Assembly in Nigeria. One of the first Nigerian female lawmakers.

Born to the Joseph and Magaret Onwuegbuzia of Umuagu quarters, Asaba now in Delta State, Nigeria, Janet attended Teachers' Training College (1930-1932), where she obtained her Grade II Teachers' certificate. She was appointed special political adviser to the Government of Anambra State from 1980 to 1983.

Janet strongly believed in ecumenism and worked closely with her friend, Lady Eudora Ibiam towards that. She led Oraifite Anglican Women's Conference for twenty-five years until she stepped down in 1995. During this period, she spearheaded the building of Boys Secondary School, Oraifite and a weaving industry amongst others. She inculcated discipline and moral values among women who respected her.

A pioneer Knight of the Order of the Saint Christopher in the old Diocese on The Niger, her role as a leader and motivator enhanced the many activities she undertook. Generous to a fault, she always supported the poor, giving money, food and clothing.

Janet has made various contributions towards the uplifting of women through her political activities. She believed in equity and pioneered several pieces of legislation such as the one that married women be paid same salary as their male counterparts. In 1949, the police killed twenty one miners who were protesting non payment of mine allowance in Enugu. Mokelu mobilized the women and demonstrated against the killing. They demanded that the policemen involved in the shooting be prosecuted and executed. They also condemned the colonial policy in all ramifications. She believed strongly that all women should vote and be voted for. Her bills as a parliamentarian attest to these. (See Parliamentary Debates of Eastern House of Chiefs. Official Report 1960-1961 and Parliamentary Debates of Eastern House of Assembly, Official Report 1961-1966.)

References

1910 births
2003 deaths
Nigerian politicians